The 2023 Nigerian presidential election in Ogun State was held on 25 February 2023 as part of the nationwide 2023 Nigerian presidential election to elect the president and vice president of Nigeria. Other federal elections, including elections to the House of Representatives and the Senate, will also be held on the same date while state elections will be held two weeks afterward on 11 March.

Background
Ogun State is a small, Yoruba-majority southwestern state with vast natural areas and significant economic growth but facing a lack of affordable housing, an underdeveloped agricultural sector, and brain drain.

Politically, the 2019 elections were categorized as a reassertion of the state APC's control in the wake of a party rift that led allies of outgoing Governor Ibikunle Amosun to defect to the APM. Despite the defections, the APC held the gubernatorial office by a narrow 3% margin and the party won a majority in the House of Assembly. Federally, the APC swept all three Senate seats and won most House of Representatives seats. For the presidency, Ogun was won by APC nominee Muhammadu Buhari with about 50% but swung slightly towards the PDP.

Polling

Projections

General election

Results

By senatorial district 
The results of the election by senatorial district.

By federal constituency
The results of the election by federal constituency.

By local government area 
The results of the election by local government area.

See also 
 2023 Ogun State elections
 2023 Nigerian presidential election

Notes

References 

Ogun State gubernatorial election
2023 Ogun State elections
Ogun